Thracides cilissa is a butterfly in the family Hesperiidae. It is found in Pará, Brazil.

References

Butterflies described in 1867
Hesperiinae
Hesperiidae of South America
Taxa named by William Chapman Hewitson